Megachile albiceps is a species of bee in the family Megachilidae. It was described by Pasteels in 1903.

References

Albiceps
Insects described in 1903